Ummah Foods, established in 2004, is a UK manufacturer of halal chocolates, meaning that they are acceptable for consumption by Muslims under Islamic law. This means that no alcohols, or animal fats are used in the ingredients, manufacturing process, or packaging.

The company was founded by Khalid Sharif. Ummah originally produced two chocolate bars, in caramel and orange flavors. It has since expanded to five flavors. Ummah chocolate is carried by select Asda and Tesco locations.

Ummah brands itself as a community-focused company. To that end, it pledges to donate ten percent of profits to charity and use sustainable manufacturing processes. The company hires Muslim artists to design its wrappers and branding.

Ummah has been praised for successfully marketing to Muslims and non-Muslims alike as a niche product. It has also attracted criticism for using religion as a branding tool.

See also
 List of confectionery brands

References

British chocolate companies
British companies established in 2004
Food manufacturers of the United Kingdom
Islam in the United Kingdom
Halal food
Food and drink companies established in 2004
2004 establishments in England